229762 Gǃkúnǁʼhòmdímà (provisional designation ) is a trans-Neptunian object and binary system from the extended scattered disc, located in the outermost region of the Solar System. This medium-sized TNO appears to be representative of a class of mid-sized objects under approximately 1000 km that have not collapsed into fully solid bodies. Its 100-kilometer moon was discovered by Keith Noll, Will Grundy, and colleagues with the Hubble Space Telescope in 2008, and named Gǃòʼé ǃHú.

Names
The name Gǃkúnǁʼhòmdímà is from the Juǀʼhoansi (ǃKung) people of Namibia. Gǃkúnǁʼhòmdímà is the beautiful aardvark girl of Juǀʼhoan mythology, who sometimes appears in the stories of other San peoples as a python girl or elephant girl; she defends her people and punishes wrongdoers using gǁámígǁàmì spines, a rain-cloud full of hail, and her magical oryx horn. The name "Gǃkúnǁʼhòmdímà" derives from gǃkún 'aardvark', ǁʼhòm mà 'young woman' and the feminine suffix dí. The moon Gǃòʼé ǃHú is named after her horn: it means simply 'oryx' (gǃòʼé) 'horn' (ǃhú).

Planetary symbols are no longer much used in astronomy, so Gǃkúnǁʼhòmdímà never received a symbol in the astronomical literature. There is no standard symbol for Gǃkúnǁʼhòmdímà used by astrologers either. An aardvark's head has been used.

Orbit

Gǃkúnǁʼhòmdímà orbits the Sun at a distance of 37.5–107.9 AU once every 620 years and 2 months (226,517 days; semi-major axis of 72.72 AU). Its orbit has an eccentricity of 0.48 and an inclination of 23° with respect to the ecliptic. It is a scattered-disc object.

An eccentricity of 0.48 suggests that it was gravitationally scattered into its current eccentric orbit. It will come to perihelion in February 2046, and mutual occultation events with its satellite will begin in late 2050 and last most of that decade. It has a bright absolute magnitude of 3.7, and has been observed 178 times over 16 oppositions with precovery images back to 1982.

Physical characteristics
Stellar occultation events indicate that Gǃkúnǁʼhòmdímà has an effective (equivalent-sphere) diameter of 600–670 km, but is not spherical. Due to complications from its non-spherical shape, the rotational period cannot be definitely determined from current light-curve data, which has an amplitude of Δm = 0.03 ± 0.01 mag, but the simplest solution is 11.05 hours. It is almost certainly between that and 41 hours. The satellite Gǃòʼé ǃHú is unlikely to comprise more than 1% or so of the total.

Grundy et al. propose that the low density and albedo of Gǃkúnǁʼhòmdímà, combined with the fact that TNOs both larger and smaller – including comets – have a substantial fraction of rock in their composition, indicate that objects such as Gǃkúnǁʼhòmdímà and 174567 Varda (in the size range of 400–1000 km, with albedos less than ≈0.2 and densities of ≈1.2 g/cm3 or less) retain a degree of porosity in their physical structure, having never collapsed and differentiated into planetary bodies like higher density or higher albedo (and thus presumably resurfaced) 90482 Orcus and 50000 Quaoar, or at best are only partially differentiated; such objects would never have been in hydrostatic equilibrium and would not be dwarf planets at present.

Gǃkúnǁʼhòmdímà exhibits an unusual disparity of visible and near-infrared colors: it appears reddish at visible wavelengths (V–R=0.62) while it appears bluer in the near-infrared (V–I=1.09). Hence, it does not fall within the four proposed taxonomic classes for TNO colors.

Satellite

Gǃkúnǁʼhòmdímà has one known satellite, Gǃòʼé ǃHú, which is one of the reddest known TNOs. Size and mass can only be inferred. The magnitude difference between the two is  mag. Red satellites often have lower albedos than their primaries, though it is not known if that is the case with this moon. Such uncertainties do not affect density calculations of Gǃkúnǁʼhòmdímà, as Gǃòʼé ǃHú has only about 1% the total volume, and so is less important than the uncertainties in Gǃkúnǁʼhòmdímà's diameter.

See also 
 Palomar Distant Solar System Survey (PDSSS)

References

External links 
 Gǃkúnǁʼhòmdímà and Gǃòʼé ǃhú, Will Grundy, Lowell Observatory (Last updated: 24 Dec 2018)
 2007 UK126 Precovery Images
 3rd largest scattered disk object discovered (Yahoo Groups)
 2007 UK126 Minor planet designation number
 
 

Scattered disc and detached objects
Discoveries by the Palomar Observatory
Gǃkúnǁʼhòmdímà
Gǃkúnǁʼhòmdímà
Possible dwarf planets
Objects observed by stellar occultation
20071019